Akalyptoischion is a genus of coccinelloid beetle, the only member of the family Akalyptoischiidae, formerly included within the family Latridiidae but was found to place outside this family in a molecular phylogenetic analysis. There are at least 24 described species in Akalyptoischion, which are native to western North America. Members of the genus are flightless, found in oak leaf litter and in the nests of pack rats.

Species
These three species belong to the genus Akalyptoischion:
 Akalyptoischion chandleri Andrews, 1976
 Akalyptoischion dyskritos
 Akalyptoischion quadrifoveolata (Fall, 1899)

References

Coccinelloidea
Coccinelloidea genera